The 1951 Florida A&M Rattlers football team was an American football team that represented Florida A&M University as a member of the Southern Intercollegiate Athletic Conference (SIAC) during the 1951 college football season. In their seventh season under head coach Jake Gaither, the Rattlers compiled a 7–1–1 record. The team's sole loss was to Morris Brown. In the Orange Blossom Classic, the Rattlers defeated . The team played its home games at Bragg Stadium in Tallahassee, Florida.

Schedule

References

Florida AandM
Florida A&M Rattlers football seasons
Florida AandM Rattlers football